CMEC may refer to the following:
 China-Myanmar Economic Corridor "CMEC" 
 Child Maintenance and Enforcement Commission
 Conservative Middle East Council
 Cambridge Model European Council
 Carnegie Middle East Center
 China Machinery Engineering Corporation
 Christian Methodist Episcopal Church
 Council of Ministers of Education, Canada

See also
 China National Machinery Import and Export Corporation (referred as CMC)